Aakkramanam  (1981) is an Indian film in the Malayalam language by Sreekumaran Thampi starring Madhu, Jayan, Balan K. Nair, Sathaar, Sreevidya, and Jayabharathi.

Cast
 Madhu as Varghees
 Jayan as Aravindhan
 Balan K. Nair as Kaasim
 Sathaar as Police Officer
 Sreevidya as Gracy
 Jayabharathi as Shanthi
 Aranmula Ponnamma as Devaki Amma (Aravindhan's Mother)
 Jagathy Sreekumar as Close up Thankappan
 G. K. Pillai as Krishnadas
 K. P. A. C. Azeez as Rasheed
 Jalaja as Saleena
 Poojappura Ravi as Chandi (Lorry Cleaner)
 Prameela as Aysha
 Jayamalini
 Vaikom M.P Mani
 Sasikumar
 Joli Abraham
 Dhanya
 Raji
 Baby Parvathi
 Ramachandran Nair
 Ruban
 Vijayan Peyad
 Sasi (I.S.R.O)
 Sethu
 Sivakumar
 Poojapura Radhakrishnan
 Paulson
 Ravi
 L.C.R Varma
 N.S Vanjiyoor
 Sasidharan Nair
 Sasi Balaramapuram
 Susheela
 Rajamma Pothan
 Kristy
 G.P nair
 M. Sasi
 Shanthan

Soundtrack

References

External links
 

1981 films
1980s Malayalam-language films
Films directed by Sreekumaran Thampi